St Benet Fink, Tottenham, is an Anglican church in Tottenham, London.

History

Early history

The original St Benet Fink church was in Threadneedle Street in the City of London and is first mentioned in 1216. At an unknown prior date a Saint Benedict's Church had been rebuilt with a gift from one Robert Finke.

Name
Benet is short for Benedict from Saint Benedict. Historically, if there was more than one church in an area dedicated to a particular Saint then the benefactor's name was added to the church's name, hence Benet Fink.

20th century
In 1904, a mission to this district was established and a Tin Tabernacle opened in Granger Road in 1905, dedicated to St Luke, while funds were raised to build a permanent building. The current church was built during 1911 and 1912, and at its consecration on 15 May 1912, the Bishop of London referred to it as "the little Cathedral"; given its light and airy interior, reminiscent of Gothic cathedral architecture, it is easy to see why. The architect was J. S. Alder, and St Benet's is said to be his most complete and unaltered church. The spire houses a single bell, as was common architectural practice at the beginning of the last century; the building has a Grade II listing. The symbols in the windows are the symbols of the saints and martyrs of Christian antiquity.

Architecture
The church is of red brick with a slate roof and has a small spire that accommodates a single bell. It is the style that was common in north London at the beginning of the twentieth century. The site includes a matching vicarage and church hall.

Incumbents

Reference:.

References

External links
 Aerial view
 Church Website

Tottenham
Diocese of London
20th-century Church of England church buildings
Churches in Tottenham
Tottenham